Harold "Hooley" Zerby (September 21, 1902 – October 12, 1963) was an American football player and golfer.

Zerby was born in Canton, Ohio and lived there throughout his life. He played one game in the National Football League with the Canton Bulldogs during the 1926. He was born in Canton.

Zerby was also a golfer. He won the amateur championship of Stark County, Ohio, in 1941. In 1950, he was appointed as the pro manager at the Tam-O-Shanter golf course in Canton, Ohio. He remained as the pro and manager at Tam-O-Shanter until his retirement in 1962. He died in 1963 at his home in Canton.

References

1902 births
1963 deaths
Players of American football from Canton, Ohio
Canton Bulldogs players